Unite may refer to:

Arts, entertainment, and media

Music

Albums
Unite (A Friend in London album), 2013 album by Danish band A Friend in London
Unite (Kool & the Gang album), 1993
Unite (The O.C. Supertones album), 2005

Songs
"Unite!", a 2001 song by Ayumi Hamasaki
"Unite", a song by The Beastie Boys from Hello Nasty
"Unite", 1988 single by Leroy Sibbles
"Unite" (Bliss n Eso song) by Australian rap group Bliss n Eso

Periodicals
Unite, the newspaper of the United Socialist Party (UK)

Companies and organizations

Companies
Unité, a mobile network operator in Moldova
Unite Group, a U.K. company that specialises in student accommodation

Labor unions 
UNITE HERE, a labor union in the U.S. and Canada, formed by the merger of UNITE and HERE in 2004
Union of Needletrades, Industrial and Textile Employees, or UNITE, a labor union in the U.S. from 1995–2004
Unite the Union, a British and Irish trade union, formed by the merger of Amicus and T&G
Unite Union (Australia), a trade union in Australia
Unite Union, a trade union in New Zealand

Other companies and organizations
UNiTE to End Violence against Women, organising name for the International Day for the Elimination of Violence against Women

Ships
 Unité, a French ship captured by the British Royal Navy and renamed 
 , a British Royal Navy ship name
 , captured by the British Royal Navy and renamed HMS Unite
 , captured by the British Royal Navy, originally the French ship Impérieuse

Other uses 
Unite (English coin), first produced during the reign of James I
Unite (horse), a racehorse
UNITE (satellite), a CubeSat nanosatellite
Unite, the domain name for the web address of the State University of Tetova, Macedonia
Opera Unite, a now discontinued sharing and collaboration platform based on the Opera browser
Unité d'Habitation, a modernist residential housing design principle developed by Le Corbusier
Unite, annual developer conferences organized by Unity Technologies

See also
Unit (disambiguation)
United (disambiguation)
Unity (disambiguation)